Borboryctis euryae is a moth of the family Gracillariidae. It is known from Japan (Honshū, Kyūshū, Shikoku and Tusima).

The larvae feed on Eurya emarginata and Eurya japonica. They mine the leaves of their host plant and induce a gall in their mine at fourth instar.

References 

Acrocercopinae
Moths described in 1988
Moths of Japan